Daniele Quadrini (born 12 July 1980 in Rome) is an Italian footballer who plays as a right winger, both in midfield as well as in an attacking trident. Quadrini wore the number 21 jersey and spent a considerable three seasons with Treviso. In August 2009, following the disbandment of his former club Treviso, he joined Serie B side Sassuolo on a free transfer. He currently plays for U.S. Arezzo.

External links
http://www.gazzetta.it/Speciali/serie_b_2007/giocatori/quadrini_dan.shtml
http://www.gazzetta.it/speciali/2008/calcio/Players/player_p62746.shtml

Italian footballers
S.S. Lazio players
A.C. Ancona players
Calcio Padova players
Treviso F.B.C. 1993 players
F.C. Grosseto S.S.D. players
Serie B players
Association football forwards
Footballers from Rome
1980 births
Living people